Teorija in praksa is a peer-reviewed academic journal covering the social sciences. It is published by the Faculty of Social Sciences of the University of Ljubljana and the editor-in-chief is Anton Grizold. The journal was established in 1964.

Abstracting and indexing
The journal is abstracted and indexed in:
EBSCO databases
Emerging Sources Citation Index
International Bibliography of Periodical Literature
Modern Language Association Database
ProQuest databases
Scopus

See also 
List of academic journals published in Slovenia

References

External links

Faculty of Social Sciences, Ljubljana
Political science journals
Publications established in 1964
University of Ljubljana publications
Academic journals of Slovenia
Slovene-language journals
Academic journals published in Slovenia